I'm a Jayhawk is the fight song of the University of Kansas.

History
The original lyrics and music were written by George "Dumpy" Bowles in 1911. The lyrics to the song are generally not sung, instead, fans do a specific clap as the KU band plays the melody. The university bands do not play the intro, but only play the chorus of the song.

The song was updated in 1958 to reflect the teams of the Big 8 Conference.  The lyrics were rewritten again in 2010 to account for the departure of Nebraska and Colorado from the Big 12 Conference.  The school has elected to not rewrite the lyrics following the departure of Texas A&M and Missouri from the league.

Lyrics

External links
 Birth of the Songs

References

University of Kansas
American college songs
College fight songs in the United States
Big 12 Conference fight songs
1912 songs